Fernando Núñez Sagredo (died 31 March 1639) was a Roman Catholic prelate who served as Bishop of Nicaragua (1631–1639).

Biography
Fernando Núñez Sagredo  was ordained a priest in the Order of the Most Holy Trinity.
On 3 December 1631, he was appointed during the papacy of Pope Urban VIII as Bishop of Nicaragua. On 8 July 1633, he was consecrated bishop by Luis de Cañizares, Bishop of Comayagua. He served as Bishop of Nicaragua until his death on 31 March 1639.

References

External links and additional sources
 (for Chronology of Bishops) 
 (for Chronology of Bishops) 

17th-century Roman Catholic bishops in Nicaragua
Bishops appointed by Pope Urban VIII
1639 deaths
Trinitarian bishops
Roman Catholic bishops of León in Nicaragua